A food truck is a large motorized vehicle (such as a van) or trailer, equipped to cook, prepare, serve, and/or sell food. Some, including ice cream trucks, sell frozen or prepackaged food; others have on-board kitchens and prepare food from scratch, or they heat up food that was prepared in a brick and mortar commercial kitchen. Sandwiches, hamburgers, french fries, and other regional fast food fare is common. By the early 2010s, amid the pop-up restaurant phenomenon, food trucks offering gourmet cuisine and a variety of specialties and ethnic menus became particularly popular. Food trucks may also sell cold beverages such as soda pop and water. Food trucks, along with food booths and food carts, are major components of the street food industry that serves an estimated 2.5 billion people every day.

History

United States
In the United States, the Texas chuckwagon is a precursor to the American food truck. In the later 1800s, herding cattle from the Southwest to markets in the North and East kept cowhands on the trail for months at a time. In 1866, the "father of the Texas Panhandle", Charles Goodnight, a Texas cattle rancher, fitted a sturdy old United States Army wagon with interior shelving and drawers, and stocked it with kitchenware, food and medical supplies. Food consisted of dried beans, coffee, cornmeal, greasy cloth-wrapped bacon, salt pork, beef, usually dried or salted, and other easy to preserve food stuffs. The wagon was also stocked with a water barrel and a sling to kindle wood to heat and cook food.

Another early relative of the modern food truck is the lunch wagon, as conceived by food vendor Walter Scott in 1872. Scott cut windows in a small covered wagon, parked it in front of a newspaper office in Providence, Rhode Island, and sold sandwiches, pies and coffee to pressmen and journalists. By the 1880s, former lunch-counter boy, Thomas H. Buckley, was manufacturing lunch wagons in Worcester, Massachusetts. He introduced various models, like the Owl and the White House Cafe, with features that included sinks, refrigerators and cooking stoves, also colored windows and other ornamentation.

Later versions of the food truck were mobile canteens, which were created in the late 1950s. These mobile canteens were authorized by the U.S. Army and operated on stateside army bases.

Mobile food trucks, nicknamed "roach coaches" or "gut trucks", have been around for years, serving construction sites, factories, and other blue-collar locations. In big cities of the U.S. the food truck traditionally provided a means for the on-the-go person to grab a quick bite at a low cost. Food trucks are not only sought out for their affordability but as well for their nostalgia; and their popularity continues to rise.

During the 2010s the economic changes caused by the Great Recession, technological factors, and street food being "hip" or "chic" have combined to increase the number of food trucks in the United States. The construction business was drying up, leading to a surplus of food trucks, and chefs from high-end restaurants were being laid off. For experienced cooks suddenly without work, the food truck seemed a clear choice, and a smaller financial investment than a brick-and-mortar restaurant.

Once more commonplace in American coastal big cities like New York City and Los Angeles, gourmet food trucks are now to be found as well in the suburbs, and in small towns across the country. Food trucks are also being hired for special events, like weddings, movie shoots, and corporate gatherings, and also to carry advertising promoting companies and brands.

Gourmet trucks
In 2011, USA Today noted that food trucks selling pricier food were gaining popularity across the United States, contrary to a common perception that food trucks are typically run-down and found at construction sites. In 2009, New York magazine noted that the food truck had "largely transcended its roach-coach classification and is now a respectable venue for aspiring chefs to launch careers." These gourmet trucks' menus run the gamut of ethnic and fusion cuisine. Often focusing on limited but creative dishes at reasonable prices, they offer customers a chance to experience food they otherwise may not. Finding a niche seems to be a path to success for most trucks. While one truck may specialize in outlandish burgers, another may serve only lobster rolls.

Gourmet food trucks can also offer a unique dining experience. With the rise of millennial diners, experiential dining has become more mainstream, driving restaurant and food truck owners to create a unique experience for their customers. As food trucks are mobile, this provides an advantage to gourmet trucks to take their experience anywhere they may please.

Tracking food trucks has been made easy with social media like Facebook and Twitter, where a favorite gourmet truck can be located at any moment, with updates on specials, new menu items and location changes.

Food truck rallies and food truck parks are also growing in popularity in the US. At rallies, people can find their favorite trucks all in one place and as well provide a means for a variety of diverse cultures to come together and find a common ground over a love for food. On August 31, 2013, Tampa hosted the world's largest food truck rally, with 99 trucks attending. The Tampa Rally broke its own record by bringing together 121 food trucks in 2014. Chicago Food Truck Festival hosts over 40 trucks each year with 60,000 guests participating over two days in Chicago. And food truck parks, offering permanent locations, are found in urban and suburban areas across the US.

The popularity of food trucks lead to the creation of associations that protect and support their business rights, such as the Philadelphia Mobile Food Association.

Business and economics
Food trucks are subject to the same range of concerns as other foodservice businesses. They generally require a fixed address to accept delivery of supplies. A commercial kitchen may be needed for food prep. There are a variety of permits to obtain, and a health code to observe. Labor and fuel costs are a significant part of the overhead.

Legal definitions and requirements for food trucks vary widely by country and locality. For example, in Toronto, some of the requirements include business and liability insurance, a Commercial Vehicle Operator's Registration for the truck, permits for each municipality being operated in (downtown, various suburbs), a food handler certificate, appropriate driver's licenses for drivers, assistant's licenses for assistants, and a health inspection.

As the rising number and popularity of food trucks push them into the food mainstream, region by region, problems with local legislators and police reacting to new situations, and pushback from brick-and-mortar restaurants fearing competition, are amongst issues having to be worked through, creating significant business uncertainty. Chicago long held the distinction of being the only city in the United States that did not allow food trucks to cook on board, which required trucks to prepare food in a commercial kitchen, then wrap and label the food and load it into a food warmer. In 2012, under pressure from food truck owners and supporters, including the University of Chicago Law School, regulations were changed to allow on-board cooking, however, controversially, food trucks are required to park 200 feet away from any restaurant, which virtually eliminates busy downtown locations (an example of pushback, restaurant owners lobbying city government).

In the US, specialized food truck outfitters offer comprehensive start-up services that can include concept development, training, and business support, in addition to outfitted trucks. Often, however, it makes more sense for a new operator to lease a truck. In the US, food trucks are a $1.2 billion industry. By 2017, the US food truck industry had surpassed $2.7 billion.

Expansion from a single truck to fleets and retail outlets has proven possible. Los Angeles-based gourmet ice cream maker Coolhaus grew from a single truck in 2009 to 11 trucks and carts, two storefronts, and over 2,500 retail partner stores by September 2014.

The libertarian Reason magazine states that in US, cities, food trucks are subject to protectionist regulations designed to prevent them from competing with brick and mortar restaurants. For example, in Chicago, a regulation prevents food trucks "...from selling food within 200 feet of brick-and-mortar restaurants and, hence, prohibit them from operating throughout the city's downtown area", which critics have called an "anti-competitive" rule for food truck operators.

Health concerns
In 1936 the Food Code spread its regulatory umbrella to include food trucks as a result of their introduction to society.

Food trucks have unique health risks compared to regular land-based restaurants when it comes to food safety and the prevention of foodborne illness. Most food trucks do not have access to adequate clean and hot water necessary to wash hands or to rinse off vegetables, as required by most health codes or regulations.

In June 2017, The Boston Globe reviewed the 2016 city health records and found that food trucks had been cited for violations 200 times, with half of the violations being minor in nature and the other half being serious violations. When compared to fixed location restaurants, the city closed nine of the 96 licensed food trucks in 2016 and closed only two out of 100 restaurants. A majority of the serious violations were related to the lack of water and hand washing. An earlier study showed that Boston food trucks, on average, received 2.68 violations per inspection between 2011 and July 2013, while restaurants received 4.56 citations for violations per inspection. For "critical foodborne violations"—defined by the city as activities that contribute to foodborne illness, such as improper labeling of ingredients—food trucks and restaurants were roughly equivalent, with 0.87 violations per inspection for food trucks, and 0.84 for restaurants..

Around the world

Asia-Pacific

Australia

Food trucks are available across Australia, and are covered as a popular trend in the media. An Australian national online directory, Where The Truck, lists some 500 food trucks. The current number is around 5000 food trucks

Japan

In Japan, there are bento (box lunch), ramen, fried chicken, fried bread, pizza, crepes, and ice cream "kitchen cars" (キッチンカー).

Hong Kong
In Hong Kong, food trucks started to hit the streets in February 2017.

South Korea
The national government legalized food trucks in South Korea in September 2014 and numbers have continued to climb steadily since then. Many young people are trying to create food trucks, and a wider range of products is becoming available. However, it is not possible to operate food trucks everywhere. In the case of Korea, there is only a limited number of places designated by each local government.

Belgium
Chip trucks have long been a staple of the Belgian countryside. The Belgian Food Truck Association is lobbying to legalize food trucks on the street. Brussels was the first European city to propose locations for food trucks at football matches. Belgium also holds the Brussels Food Truck Festival, the largest of its kind in Europe, every year in May.

Brazil
In Brazil, food trucks started with trucks that served food during carnival time and at the end of soccer games, sporting events and concerts. However, when trucks began to serve gourmet food (with higher prices), food trucks were no longer associated with popular food, and it became trendy to eat street food from food trucks. Nowadays they are all over Brazil, workplaces, schools, colleges, office buildings, industrial parks, workshops: that is, any place where there is potential demand for regular meals or snacks.

Canada

In Canada, food trucks, also commonly known as cantines (French for cafeteria) in Quebec, are present across the country, serving a wide variety of cuisines, including anything from grilled cheese sandwiches to Mexican.

France
Pizza trucks have been common in Provence since the 1960s or earlier, and food trucks are common at outdoor markets, but American-style trucks selling restaurant-quality food first appeared in Paris in 2012. Their owners needed to obtain permission from four separate government agencies, including the Prefecture of Police, but the trucks' offerings—including tacos and hamburgers—have reportedly been very popular.

Ireland

Compared to other countries, food trucks in Ireland are a relatively new addition to the Irish food industry. All food trucks in Ireland must be registered with the Health Service Executive (HSE) and are inspected by Environmental Health Officers (EHO).

Mexico
Although street food in Mexico is unregulated, food trucks are becoming increasingly popular as of 2013 and owners have created an association to pursue the professionalization and expansion of this commercial sector. In addition to the food trucks catering on the streets, there are regular bazaars organized to introduce their products to the consumers.

In response to this popularity the Local Authorities have issued a series of special regulations to incorporate them to legal schemes that would help to order this commerce form. as new food truck business model emerged, some local bodybuilders begin to make food trucks from new vehicles from major car-makers.

United Kingdom
With the advent of motorised transport during World War II, food trucks came into common use. Mobile canteens were used in almost all theatres of war to boost morale and provide food as a result of the successful tea lady experiment.

Food trucks today are sometimes known as snack vans or burger vans, and can be found on nearly all major trunk roads at the side of the road or in areas that have a large pedestrian population, such as at village fetes or town centers. These vans can specialise in myriad different food types, such as donuts, hamburgers, chili and chips, as well as ethnic food. Some people prefer to stop at snack vans when travelling, due to the low price, rather than stop at a motorway service station where prices can be extremely high.

With the British street food industry growing 20% year-on-year, the increase in popularity of having a mobile food van at events has been substantial.

In popular culture
 Both The Great Food Truck Race (Food Network) and Eat St. (Cooking Channel) feature food trucks and mobile food carts from all over the U.S.
 On Food Network Canada, Food Truck Face Off has four teams battle for the grand prize, use of a customized food truck for one year. Also on the network, an episode of Kid in a Candy Store looks behind the scenes at a gourmet dessert truck.
 In the 2014 American comedy-drama film Chef, a high-end chef has a kitchen meltdown and rediscovers his passion for cooking while driving and operating a simple food truck across America.
 During Donald Trump's 2016 campaign for president, Marco Gutierrez, founder of a group known as "Latinos for Trump" warned in an MSNBC interview that there would be "taco trucks on every corner" if Mexican immigration to the U.S. continued. This triggered widespread derision and a Twitter meme "#TacoTrucksOnEveryCorner."

See also 

 Campervan
 Concession stand
 Diner
 Doner kebab
 Food truck rally
 List of food trucks
 Mobile catering
 Motorhome
 Taco stand
 Yatai (food cart)

References

External links 
 
 Food Truck Nation, report on regulations in the U.S.

Catering
Fast food

Innovation
Snack foods
Street food
Restaurants by type
Retail formats